Muhammad Kamal Malik is a Pakistani politician who had been a member of the National Assembly of Pakistan, from May 2016 to May 2018.

Political career

He was elected to the National Assembly of Pakistan as a candidate of Muttahida Qaumi Movement (MQM) from Constituency NA-245 (Karachi-VII) in by-election held in 2016. He received 39,597 votes and defeated Shahid Hussain, a candidate of Pakistan Peoples Party (PPP). The seat became vacant after Nabil Gabol who won it in 2013 Pakistani general election vacated it after resigning from MQM.

References

Living people
Muhajir people
Muttahida Qaumi Movement politicians
Pakistani MNAs 2013–2018
Politicians from Karachi
Muttahida Qaumi Movement MNAs
Year of birth missing (living people)